The Really Loud House is an American comedy television series developed by Tim Hobert that premiered on Nickelodeon on November 3, 2022. It is a live-action spin-off of The Loud House, utilizing some of the actors that appeared in the 2021 television film A Loud House Christmas.

Premise
Much like the cartoon series, this live-action adaptation portrays 11-year old Lincoln Loud surviving in a house of ten sisters where chaos typically ensues. Lincoln also journeys on adventures with his best friend Clyde McBride throughout the town of Royal Woods, Michigan.

Cast

 Wolfgang Schaeffer as Lincoln Loud
 Jahzir Bruno as Clyde McBride
 Eva Carlton as Leni Loud
 Sophia Woodward as Luna Loud
 Catherine Bradley as Luan Loud
 Annaka Fourneret as Lynn Loud Jr.
 Aubin Bradley as Lucy Loud
 Lexi Janicek as Lisa Loud
 Ella Allan as Lola Loud
 Mia Allan as Lana Loud
 Jolie Jenkins as Rita Loud
 Brian Stepanek as Lynn Loud Sr.

Recurring

 August Michael Peterson as Lily Loud
 Bella Blanding as Charlie Uggo

Production
On March 24, 2022, a live-action series of The Loud House was originally announced for Paramount+. The main cast members of A Loud House Christmas reprise their roles for the series, including Wolfgang Schaeffer as Lincoln and Jahzir Bruno as Clyde. Filming for the series began in Albuquerque, New Mexico in June 2022. In September 2022, it was announced that the series, entitled The Really Loud House, would premiere on Nickelodeon in November 2022. On October 5, 2022, it was announced that the series would premiere on November 3, 2022.

Episodes

Reception
Stephanie Snyder from Common Sense Media gave the series three-out-of-five stars, saying that "the live-action show is sure to capture the hearts of young viewers who already loved The Loud House as they see the characters come to life."

Ratings
 
}}

Awards and nominations

References

External links
 
 

2020s American children's comedy television series
2020s Nickelodeon original programming
2022 American television series debuts
American television spin-offs
English-language television shows
The Loud House
Nickelodeon original programming
Works based on animated television series